Francesco Forte may refer to
Francesco Forte (footballer, born 1991), Italian professional footballer, goalkeeper
Francesco Forte (footballer, born 1993), Italian professional footballer, forward
Francesco Forte (footballer, born 1998), Italian professional footballer, defender
Francesco Forte (politician) (1929–2022), Italian politician and academic